The 2009 Scotties Tournament of Hearts, the Canadian women's national curling championship, was held from February 21 to March 1 at the Save-On-Foods Memorial Centre in Victoria, British Columbia.

Teams
{| border=1 cellpadding=5 cellspacing=0
!bgcolor="#ff7799" width="200"|Team Canada 
!bgcolor="#0033ff" width="200"|
!bgcolor="#0099ff" width="200"|British Columbia
|- align=center
|align=left|St. Vital Curling Club, Winnipeg
Skip: Jennifer Jones
Third: Cathy Overton-Clapham
Second: Jill Officer
Lead: Dawn Askin
Alternate: Jennifer Clark-Rouire
|align=left|Calgary Curling Club &Calgary Winter Club, Calgary
Skip: Cheryl Bernard
Third: Susan O'Connor
Second: Carolyn Darbyshire
Lead: Cori Bartel
Alternate: Karen Russ
|align=left|Vancouver Curling Club, Vancouver
Skip: Marla Mallett
Third: Grace MacInnes
Second: Diane Gushulak
Lead: Jacalyn Brown
Alternate: Adina Tasaka
|- border=1 cellpadding=5 cellspacing=0
!bgcolor="#ffff99" width="200"|Manitoba
!bgcolor="#ffff33" width="200"|New Brunswick
!bgcolor="#ff5577" width="200"|Newfoundland and Labrador
|- align=center
|align=left|Fort Rouge Curling Club, Winnipeg
Skip: Barb Spencer
Third: Darcy Robertson
Second: Brette Richards
Lead: Barb Enright
Alternate: Kristy Jenion
|align=left|Fredericton Curling Club, Fredericton
Skip: Andrea Kelly
Third: Denise Nowlan
Second: Jodie DeSolla
Lead: Lianne Sobey
Alternate: Melissa Adams
|align=left|St. John's Curling Club, St. John's
Skip: Heather Strong
Third: Cathy Cunningham
Second: Laura Strong
Lead: Peg Goss
Alternate: Susan O'Leary
|- border=1 cellpadding=5 cellspacing=0
!bgcolor="#cc99ee" width="200"|Nova Scotia
!bgcolor="#ff7777" width="200"|Ontario
!bgcolor="#009900" width="200"|Prince Edward Island
|- align=center
|align=left|Dartmouth Curling Club, Dartmouth
Skip: Nancy McConnery
Third: Jennifer Crouse
Second: Sheena Gilman
Lead: Jill Thomas
Alternate: Colleen Pinkney
|align=left|Fort William Curling Club, Thunder Bay
Skip: Krista McCarville
Third: Tara George
Second: Kari MacLean
Lead: Lorraine Lang
Alternate: Ashley Miharija
|align=left|Charlottetown Curling Club, Charlottetown
Fourth: Robyn MacPhee
Skip: Rebecca Jean MacPhee
Second: Shelley Muzika
Lead: Tammi Lowther
Alternate: Nacy Cameron
|- border=1 cellpadding=5 cellspacing=0
!bgcolor="#00ffff" width="200"|Quebec 
!bgcolor="#33cc00" width="200"|Saskatchewan
!bgcolor="#cccccc" width="200"|Northwest Territories/Yukon
|- align=center
|align=left|Club de curling Etchemin, Saint-Romuald
Skip: Marie-France Larouche
Third: Nancy Bélanger
Second: Annie Lemay 
Lead: Joëlle Sabourin
Alternate: Veronique Brassard
|align=left| CN Curling Club, Saskatoon
Skip: Stefanie Lawton
Third: Marliese Kasner
Second: Sherri Singler
Lead: Lana Vey
Alternate: Teejay Surik|align=left|Yellowknife Curling Club, YellowknifeSkip: Kerry Galusha
Third: Dawn Moses
Second: Shona Barbour
Lead: Heather McCagg
Alternate: Sharon Cormier|}

Round-Robin Standings

Quebec was awarded 2nd Place by virtue of the pre tournament draw to the button plus victories over Team PEI and Team Saskatchewan. 
Saskatchewan was awarded 3rd place by virtue of having beaten both Team Canada and Team PEI during the round robin.

ResultsAll times localDraw 1February 21, 12:00 PMDraw 2February 21, 7:00 PMDraw 3February 22, 8:30 AMDraw 4February 22, 1:00 PMDraw 5February 22, 6:30 PMDraw 6February 23, 8:30 AMDraw 7February 23, 1:00 PMDraw 8February 23, 6:30 PMDraw 9February 24, 8:30 AMDraw 10February 24, 1:00 PMDraw 11February 24, 6:30 PMDraw 12February 25, 8:30 AMDraw 13February 25, 1:00 PMDraw 14February 25, 7:00 PMDraw 15February 26, 8:30 AMDraw 16February 26, 1:00 PMDraw 17February 26, 6:30 PMTiebreakerFebruary 27, 1:00 PMPlayoffs

1 vs. 2February 27, 6:30 PM3 vs. 4February 28, 11:30 AMSemifinalFebruary 28, 4:00 PMFinalMarch 1, 5:00 PM''

Top 5 Player percentages

Leads

Seconds

Thirds

Skips

See also
 2009 Tim Hortons Brier
 2009 Canadian Olympic Curling Trials

Notes

External links

Curling Scoops Coverage of the 2009 Scotties Tournament Of Hearts

 
Scotties Tournament of Hearts
Sports competitions in Victoria, British Columbia
Curling in British Columbia
Scotties Tournament of Hearts
Scotties Tournament of Hearts
Scotties Tournament of Hearts
Scotties Tournament of Hearts